Farrukh Dhondy (born 1944) is an Indian-born British writer, playwright, screenwriter and left-wing activist who resides in the United Kingdom.

Education
Dhondy was born in 1944 in Poona, India, where he attended The Bishop's School, and obtained a BSc degree from the University of Poona (1964). He won a scholarship to Pembroke College, Cambridge, where he read Natural Sciences before switching to English, earning a BA degree in 1967. After graduating he studied for a master's degree at Leicester University and was later a lecturer at Leicester College of Further Education and Archbishop Temple School in Lambeth in London.

Early activism
In Leicester, Dhondy became involved with the Indian Workers' Association and later, in London, with the British Black Panthers, joining the publication Race Today in 1970, along with his close friend Darcus Howe, and former partner Mala Sen, and discovering his calling as a writer.

Writing 
Dhondy's literary output is extensive, including books for children, textbooks and biographies, as well as plays for theatre and scripts for film and television. He is also a columnist, a biographer (of C. L. R. James; 2001), and media executive, having been Commissioning Editor at Channel Four television from 1984 to 1997. During his time with Channel Four, he wrote the comedy series Tandoori Nights (1985–87) for the channel, which concerned the rivalry of two curry-house owners.

His children's stories include KBW (Keep Britain White), a study of a young white boy's response to anti-Bengali racism. In 2011 Dhondy published his translation of selections from the Sufi poet Jalaluddin Rumi, Rumi: a New Translation. Dhondy also wrote the screenplay for the 2005 Bollywood historical blockbuster Mangal Pandey: The Rising, starring Aamir Khan and Toby Stephens. In 2012, Dhondy scripted a short film called The K File. This film dealt with a fictional take on the judgement of Ajmal Kasab and was directed by Oorvazi Irani. In 2013, Dhondy's play Devdas was premiered in London and was subsequently replayed globally. 2013 also saw the publication of his novel Prophet Of Love (HarperCollins). His collection of Rumi translations was published in 2014 and received a 4.5-star rating on Goodreads.

Dhondy was lauded in the respected political magazine New Internationalist, in its prestigious "final page", which led to the resurgence of his lifelong campaign to recruit more BAME talent at the BBC, with an article subsequently printed in the New Statesman (covered in The Voice newspaper).

His latest book, Hawk and Hyena, follows the story of Charles Sobhraj. Dhondy appeared on the podcast The Literary City with Ramjee Chandran to talk about his escapades with Charles Sobhraj as well as about his autobiography, Fragments Against My Ruin: A Life. Dhondy was at the 2022 Jaipur Literature Festival, London edition to talk about his books.

Honours and awards
 Children's Rights Workshop Other award: 1977, for East End at Your Feet, and 1979, for Come to Mecca, and Other Stories; 
 Collins/Fontana Award for Come to Mecca, and Other Stories;
 Works represented in Children's Fiction in Britain, 1900–1990 exhibition, British Council's Literature Department, 1990; 
 Whitbread Award for first novel, 1990, for Bombay Duck.

Books
 East End at Your Feet (short stories), London: Macmillan Publishers, 1976.
 Come to Mecca, and Other Stories, London: Collins, 1978.
 The Siege of Babylon (novel), London: Macmillan, 1978.
 Poona Company (short stories), London: Gollancz, 1980.
 Trip Trap (short stories), Faber and Faber (London, England), 1985.
 Vigilantes, Hobo Press, 1988
 Bombay Duck (adult novel), London: Jonathan Cape (London, England), 1990.
 Black Swan, Gollancz (London, England), 1992, Boston, MA: Houghton Mifflin Harcourt, 1993.
 Janacky and the Giant, and Other Stories, London: HarperCollins, 1993.
 C. L. R. James: Cricket, The Caribbean and World Revolution, 205pp, London: Weidenfeld & Nicolson, 2001.
 The Bikini Murders, based on the life of Charles Shobhraj (also known as "the Bikini Killer"), 2008. Currently in production as a feature film.
 Rumi: A New Translation (trans. & ed.), Harper Perennial, 2011
 Prophet Of Love, HarperCollins, 2013
 Fragments Against My Ruin: A Life (autobiography), 2021

Plays
 Mama Dragon, produced in London, England, 1980.
 Trojans (adaptation of a play by Euripides), produced in London, England, 1982.
 Kipling Sahib, produced in London, England, 1982.
 Vigilantes (produced in 1985), Hobo Press, 1988.
 King of the Ghetto (television series), British Broadcasting Company (BBC1), 1986.
 Split Wide Open (screenplay; based on the story by Dev Benegal), Adlabs/BMG Crescendo, 1999.
 Devdas, premiered in London, 2013.

See also
 Bandit Queen, 1994 film based on late wife Mala Sen's book India's Bandit Queen: The True Story of Phoolan Devi (1993)
 Red Mercury (2005)

References

External links

Biography of Dhondy on Answers.com, from Gale Biographies of Children's Authors

1944 births
Living people
Alumni of Pembroke College, Cambridge
Alumni of the University of Leicester
British male journalists
British people of Parsi descent
British writers
British writers of Indian descent
British Zoroastrians
English people of Parsi descent
Indian emigrants to England
Savitribai Phule Pune University alumni
Writers from Pune